Irit Lillian (born 1962, Rehovot) is the Israeli Ambassador to Turkey.

When Naftali Tamir was recalled as Ambassador to Australia, Lillian became Acting Ambassador.

During her military service, Lillian was a producer and editor in the IDF radio station (Galei Tsahal). She earned a B.A in Archaeology and Egyptology from Tel Aviv University and M.A in Eastern and Western Studies in the HUJ. Lillian joined the Israeli Ministry of Foreign Affairs in 1986. Lillian appointed as the Israeli Ambassador to Turkey, she served as the charge d'affaires at Ankara Embassy ultimately.

References

External links
H.E. Irit Lillian, Ambassador of the State of Israel to Bulgaria: ' Valeri Simeonov Should Apologize to All Jewish People'
Statement of support for Sofia Pride 2019 by more than 25 embassies and international organisations

1962 births
People from Rehovot
Israeli women ambassadors
Ambassadors of Israel to Turkey
Ambassadors of Israel to Bulgaria
Ambassadors of Israel to Australia
Tel Aviv University alumni
Hebrew University of Jerusalem alumni
Living people